TrackMania is a series of racing games for Microsoft Windows, PlayStation 4, PlayStation 5, Xbox One, Xbox Series X and Series S, Nintendo DS, and Wii developed by Nadeo and Firebrand Games. Instead of following the usual trend of choosing a set car and track to play the game, in TrackMania the players can create their own tracks using a "building block" process similar to games that existed before the first TrackMania game, such as the 1984 game Excitebike, the 1985 game Racing Destruction Set, and the 1990 game Stunts.

TrackMania games typically have a time trial format, with medals awarded for beating set times in single-player mode, as well as the ability to submit times to various online rankings. Players may choose to respawn (retire) at any time, for example if they land upside down, leave the track or get off to a poor start. Multiplayer races operate as concurrent time trials; players' cars are visible on the same track at the same time, but cannot physically interact with one another.

Games

TrackMania (2003)

TrackMania Sunrise

TrackMania Nations (Electronic Sports World Cup)

On January 27, 2006, Nadeo released TrackMania Nations, also called TrackMania Nations ESWC partly as a promotion for the Electronic Sports World Cup, and also for TrackMania itself. This free, stand-alone game had one new environment, "Stadium", and many of the Sunrise edition features, including the advertisement panels, which show ads from sponsors streamed from the internet. The game contains 100 single player tracks, the earlier ones relatively simple in both design and gameplay, but it is largely pitched as an online game. One of the main attractions is the leader board, where players compete for the best times and points. The top five players can be seen on the game's homepage. Nations quickly became popular with almost 1 million registered online players within weeks of its launch), largely due to the wide availability of the freeware game.

TrackMania United

On June 30, 2006, TrackMania United was announced, a version that amalgamated all previous TrackMania editions into a single game that includes all the environments from the earlier games, and subsequently future installments of the series. TrackMania United features a peer-to-peer networking system allowing players to share custom content more easily, and a unified ranking system. The updated graphics engine includes a shadow mapping acceleration system, which is used in the most recent Stadium version. The new engine allows for more realistic shadows on high end systems while the Stadium environment has double the number of blocks featured in the free version, including dirt paths, water, and indoor sections.

Focus announced on November 9, 2006, that 10,000 copies of TrackMania United could be bought and pre-loaded online then activated from November 16, 2006 onwards. The game became available in retail outlets in France, Canada, Australia, Belgium, the French-speaking part of Switzerland and Russia later in 2006, then on February 23, 2007 in Germany, then on March 9, 2007 and later in other regions.

The game is available in the UK and was made available in the US via download for $49.99 on March 23, 2007 and $39.99 on April 17, 2007. As of September 7, 2007, the game is available for $29.95. It was made available for pre-order and pre-load on Steam on June 7, 2007 and unlocked on June 14, 2007.

Players who previously purchased TrackMania or TrackMania: Sunrise can earn a daily copper bonus in TrackMania United by registering their product keys through the game.

Trackmania United Forever is an updated version of Trackmania United featuring seven environments and an all-new mediatracker. It was published by Focus Home Interactive and developed by Nadeo and has a similar layout to Trackmania Nations Forever.  Four main modes are available: "Race", "Stunt", "Platform", and "Puzzle" as well as all the tracks from Trackmania Nations.

TrackMania United Forever & Nations Forever
On October 7, 2007, Nadeo announced that they were working on updated versions of TrackMania United and TrackMania Nations. Both new versions have Forever added to their name, and are network compatible. TrackMania Nations Forever includes the new stadium blocks and physics system introduced in TrackMania United, which allow TrackMania United Forever and TrackMania Nations Forever players to compete on the same (Stadium) servers.

Nadeo has stated that because they want the game to have a long lifespan, they are working on the engine and user interface rather than adding new content. TrackMania United Forever, for instance, no longer requires the CD to be in the drive due to different copy protection and anti-cheat systems. They also warn players that some features may not be the final versions.

TrackMania United Forever was released on April 15, 2008, with the free-to-play variant TrackMania Nations Forever released the following day.

As of 9 December 2010, following the closure of the company used for providing in-game advertising, Nadeo introduced the "FreeZone" system to the game. This meant that Nations Forever players could only play on specific FreeZone servers or normal servers that they manually added to their in-game favourites list. Additionally, Nations Forever players were forced to spectate every one in five races. These changes were made as an incentive for players to upgrade to the paid TrackMania United Forever as Nadeo could no longer make money from in-game advertising.

There were also plans to add additional environments Toy and Moon, but they were scrapped.

TrackMania DS

TrackMania Turbo (DS)

TrackMania: Build to Race
On June 30, 2009, a TrackMania game for the Wii, titled TrackMania Wii was announced by jeuxvideo.com in an interview with one of the developers. The game features all the environments from TrackMania United apart from "Bay", due to the complexity of its scenery. The game was supposed to be released in North America under the title TrackMania: Build to Race on July 20, 2010 but on July 19, 2010, Michael Mota of Dreamcatcher Interactive, TrackMania Wii's publisher, told the Examiner "We made the announcement to the major retailers about the TrackMania delay; I’m not sure why that hasn’t been changed. The game has been delayed until December." The game eventually came out in North America on March 24, 2011. It has a more primitive online play system than the PC line of games and also uniquely features a special "F" class of tracks unlocked after a certain amount of medals are accrued.

An updated Wii release date on the Nintendo website for the UK version published by Focus Home Interactive has been given as September 23, 2010. The game was released in Europe with the Build to Race subtitle removed.

TrackMania2

TrackMania2: Canyon
Like previous TrackMania games, players can race on tracks while doing various stunts as well as build their own tracks. The game features a new environment, Canyon, as well as two modes, Race and Platform. Platform mode is featured in the free extension pack, TrackMania2: Platform.

Besides the new environment, the game also includes a split-screen mode, and a scripting language called "ManiaScript" which lets players add their own new features to the game.

TrackMania2: Stadium
TrackMania2: Stadium was announced on November 2, 2012. This environment was opened to the public with an open beta on February 27, 2013. The game features the classic Stadium environment that was introduced in TrackMania Nations. There have been some improvements to the graphics, and it uses ManiaPlanet's client and interface. The game was released on June 20, 2013.

TrackMania2: Valley
TrackMania2: Valley was announced on November 2, 2012. This environment became available on ManiaPlanet on July 4, 2013.

TrackMania2: Lagoon
TrackMania2: Lagoon was announced on May 9, 2017. This environment became available on ManiaPlanet on May 23, 2017. With this environment ported from TrackMania Turbo (2016), ManiaPlanet was given a large update called "ManiaPlanet 4".

TrackMania Turbo (2016)

Announced at Ubisoft's E3 2015 conference, TrackMania Turbo is a spin-off heavily inspired by 90s arcade racers. The game has been released in North America on March 22, 2016 for the PlayStation 4 and Xbox One and on March 24, 2016 for Microsoft Windows.

Trackmania (2020)

A remake of Trackmania Nations was announced for Microsoft Windows on February 29, 2020, and was due to be released on May 5, 2020, but was delayed until July 1, 2020, due to the COVID-19 pandemic. It will be set to be released on consoles and cloud platforms in early 2023.
 
The base game is free-to-play, with additional content available with a paid subscription model, including an in-game track editor, online events and car customization.

Environments
The game series' featured environments are "Desert" (also known as "Speed"), "Rally", "Snow" (also known as "Alpine"), "Bay", "Coast", "Island", "Stadium", "Canyon", "Valley", and "Lagoon".

Reception

Due to the success of the TrackMania series, Guinness World Records awarded the games six world records in the Guinness World Records: Gamer's Edition 2008. These include "Biggest Online Race", "Most Popular Online Racing Sim" and "Largest Content Base of Any Racing Game", with hundreds of thousands of user-created tracks and hundreds of unique cars available for download.

Copy protection system

The PC games in the TrackMania series used a copy protection system called StarForce, which silently installed a driver with all versions of TrackMania Original, TrackMania Sunrise and the original TrackMania Nations. Many sources falsely reported that TrackMania Nations updated the StarForce drivers only if they were already installed, although versions released after May 28, 2007, installed the StarForce drivers on all computers even though TrackMania Nations is freeware. The original TrackMania United features StarForce restrictions built into the executable to check the software's key, but it does not install the driver.

Although Valve originally included it in the system, on June 29, 2007, the company announced that the version of TrackMania United distributed via their Steam digital distribution platform would no longer include StarForce.

TrackMania United Forever and TrackMania Nations Forever do not include StarForce. If they are applied as upgrades to version of TrackMania United or TrackMania Nations which include StarForce, they attempt to remove it.

Spin-offs

As the TrackMania games have grown in popularity, Nadeo started plans for two completely new games; namely, they began work on role-playing and first-person shooter games. These were first announced in 2009 through TrackMania United Forever, where the player's loading screen was replaced with images announcing either Shootmania or Questmania. On 19 February 2012, Nadeo officially announced Shootmania. On 10 April 2013, Nadeo released Shootmania on Maniaplanet. Questmania however was never released to this day.

See also
Racing Destruction Set
Stunts, a similar game
GripShift, a similar game
Build 'n Race, a similar game
ModNation Racers, a track-building game
Hot Wheels Track Attack

References

External links

 
Multiplayer hotseat games
Multiplayer online games
Puzzle video games
Racing video games
Ubisoft franchises
Focus Entertainment games
Video game franchises introduced in 2003
Video games developed in France
Video games with stereoscopic 3D graphics
Wii games
Windows games